Ancylosis maculifera is a species of snout moth in the genus Ancylosis. It was described by Staudinger in 1870. It is found in Russia, Ukraine, Romania, Bulgaria, Spain and Kazakhstan.

The wingspan is 18–23 mm.

References

Moths described in 1870
maculifera
Moths of Europe
Moths of Asia